Freeman High School may refer to:

 Douglas S. Freeman High School, in Virginia
 Freeman High School (Adams, Nebraska)
 Freeman High School (Freeman, South Dakota)
 Freeman High School (Rockford, Washington)

See also
 Freeman Academy, in South Dakota